Nkimi is a city in Centro Sur, Equatorial Guinea. It has a (2005 est.) population of 3313.

Populated places in Centro Sur